Tebipenem (brand name Orapenem) is a broad-spectrum orally-administered antibiotic, from the carbapenem subgroup of β-lactam antibiotics. It was developed as a replacement drug to combat bacteria that had acquired antibiotic resistance to commonly used antibiotics. Tebipenem is formulated as the ester tebipenem pivoxil due to the better absorption and improved bioavailability of this form. It has performed well in clinical trials for ear infection and looks likely to be further developed in future. It is only marketed in Japan. Tebipenem is the first carbapenem whose prodrug form, the pivalyl ester, is orally available.

References 

Carbapenem antibiotics
Prodrugs
Thiazolines
Formals